The Japanese Journal of Tropical Medicine and Hygiene (print , electronic ) is a Japanese medical journal. It was established in 1973 and changed its name to Tropical Medicine and Health in 2004. Originally published in Japanese it is now published in English. It is the official journal of the Japanese Society of Tropical Medicine.

It is indexed by CAB International.

See also 
 Tropical medicine

References

External links 

Tropical medicine and hygiene journals
Academic journals associated with learned and professional societies